Switched-On Bach is the debut album by American composer Wendy Carlos, originally released under her birth name Walter Carlos in October 1968 by Columbia Records. Produced by Carlos and Rachel Elkind, the album is a collection of pieces by Johann Sebastian Bach performed by Carlos and Benjamin Folkman on a Moog synthesizer. It played a key role in bringing synthesizers to popular music, which had until then been mostly used in experimental music.

Switched-On Bach reached number 10 on the US Billboard 200 chart and topped the Billboard Classical Albums chart from 1969 to 1972. By June 1974, it had sold over one million copies, and in 1986 became the second classical album to be certified platinum. In 1970, it won Grammy Awards for Best Classical Album, Best Classical Performance – Instrumental Soloist or Soloists (With or Without Orchestra), and Best Engineered Classical Recording. After Carlos came out as a transgender woman in 1979, reissues of Switched-On Bach amended the artist credit to reflect her name, as was the case with the rest of her discography up to that point.

Background 
Around 1967, Carlos asked the musician Rachel Elkind to listen to her electronic compositions. They included compositions written ten years earlier, and some written from 1964 with her friend Benjamin Folkman at the Columbia-Princeton Electronic Music Center in New York City. One recording was a rendition of Two-Part Invention in F major by Johann Sebastian Bach, which Carlos described as "charming".

Soon after, Carlos began plans to produce an album of Bach pieces performed on the recently invented Moog synthesizer. She intended to use the novel technology to make "appealing music you could really listen to", not "ugly" music being produced by avant-garde musicians at the time. Elkind was impressed with the recording of Brandenburg Concerto No. 3 in G major and became the album's producer. Elkind contacted her friend, producer and conductor Ettore Stratta at Columbia Records, who "generously spread his enthusiasm throughout the rest of the company" and assisted in the album production. Paul Myers of Columbia Masterworks Records granted Carlos, Folkman, and Elkind artistic freedom to record and release it.

Recording 

Switched-On Bach features ten pieces by Bach available under the public domain, performed by Carlos, with assistance from Folkman, on a Moog synthesizer. Carlos worked closely with Moog designer Robert Moog, testing his components and suggesting improvements. Most of the album was recorded in a rented studio apartment in which Carlos lived at 410 West End Avenue on the West Side of Manhattan in New York City, using a custom-built 8-track recording machine constructed by Carlos from components built by Ampex.  The initial track created, however, the Invention in F major, was recorded in the spring of 1967 on a Scully tape machine in Gotham Recording Studios at 2 West 46th Street, where Carlos had brought Moog equipment for a commercial project.

According to Carlos, Switched-On Bach took approximately five months and one thousand hours to produce. As the synthesizers were monophonic, meaning only one note can be played at a time, each track was assembled one at a time. Carlos said: "You had to release the note before you could make the next note start, which meant you had to play with a detached feeling on the keyboard, which was really very disturbing in making music." The synthesizer was unreliable and often went out of tune; Carlos recalled hitting it with a hammer prior to recording to obtain correct levels. After several notes were played, it was checked again to make sure it had not drifted.

Bach provided only the two chords of a Phrygian Cadence for the second movement of the Brandenburg Concerto No. 3 in G Major, intending that the musician would improvise on these chords. Carlos and Folkman carefully constructed this piece to showcase the capabilities of the Moog.

Artwork 
Switched-On Bach was released with two different covers. The most common features a man dressed as Bach standing before a Moog synthesizer. The first pressing featured the same man seated, as shown above. Carlos and Elkind objected to the original cover and had it replaced, finding it "was a clownish, trivializing image of a mugging Bach, supposedly hearing some absurd sound from his earphones". They also objected to the fact that the synthesizer was incorrectly set up: "[The earphones] were plugged into the input, not output, of a 914 filter module, which in turn was connected to nothing, [assuring] that silence is all that would have greeted Johann Sebastian's ears."

Release 
In 1968, shortly before the release of Switched-On Bach, Robert Moog spoke at the annual Audio Engineering Society conference and played one of Carlos' recordings from the album. Moog recalled: "I walked off the stage and went to the back of the auditorium while people were listening, and I could feel it in the air. They were jumping out of their skins. These technical people were involved in so much flim-flam, so much shoddy, opportunistic stuff, and here was something that was just impeccably done and had obvious musical content and was totally innovative. The tape got a standing ovation."

Switched-On Bach was released in October 1968. In 1969, it entered the top 40 on the US Billboard 200 before it reached a peak of No. 10 that year, for a total of 59 weeks on the chart. From January 1969 to January 1972, the album was No. 1 on the Billboard Classical Albums chart, and it reached the seventh position of the Top 50 Albums chart of the Canadian magazine RPM. In February 1974, Columbia Records estimated 960,000 copies of the album had been sold in the US. In June that year, Billboard reported the album's sales surpassed one million, the second classical music record in history to achieve the feat. In August 1969, it was certified Gold by the Recording Industry Association of America, for sales in excess of 1 million copies. It reached Platinum certification in November 1986.

Reception 

Switched-On Bach was met with a negative response from some classical music traditionalists, but gained popularity among many younger listeners. In a retrospective review for AllMusic, Bruce Eder noted that Carlos' approach "was highly musical in ways that ordinary listeners could appreciate ... characterized by ... amazing sensitivity and finely wrought nuances, in timbre, tone, and expressiveness." Canadian pianist Glenn Gould spoke highly of Switched-On Bach, saying: "The whole record, in fact, is one of the most startling achievements of the recording industry in this generation and certainly one of the great feats in the history of 'keyboard' performance".

In 1970, the album won three Grammy Awards: Best Classical Album, Best Classical Performance – Instrumental Soloist or Soloists (With or Without Orchestra), and Best Engineered Classical Recording.

Influence 
Following the album's success, Moog received requests from producers and artists for his synthesizers. A number of other Moog synthesizer albums were released, such as Switched-On Rock by the Moog Machine, Music to Moog By by Gershon Kingsley, and The Moog Strikes Bach by Hans Wurman. Moog credited the album for demonstrating that synthesizers could be used for more than avant-garde music and sound effects. He said of the album's success:

In 1972 Columbia Records released an orchestral album, Switched Off Bach, with the same track listing as Switched-On Bach. The producer Giorgio Moroder credits the album for bringing synthesizers to his attention. Brian Wilson of the Beach Boys called it "one of the most electrifying albums I ever heard." It was inducted into the National Recording Registry in 2005.

Reissues 
In 1992, Carlos released Switched-On Bach 2000  to commemorate the 25th anniversary of her first album, featuring a re-recording of the record using digital synthesizers and computer-assisted recording with an added introductory composition styled as a birthday fanfare for the project. Switched-On Bach was remastered and included as part of the Switched-On Boxed Set, a four-CD box set released in 1999 with The Well-Tempered Synthesizer, Switched-On Bach II, and Switched-On Brandenburgs.

In 2001, a remastered edition of Switched-On Bach was released with a previously unreleased track, "Initial Experiments, demonstration". Carlos wrote: "You may rest assured that this is the best these recordings have ever sounded."

Track listing 

Side two

Personnel 
 Wendy Carlos – synthesizer, programming
 Benjamin Folkman – supplementary keyboards
 Rachel Elkind – production

Charts

References

External links 
 Wendy Carlos, S-OB
 
 
 Drew University Music Department, current owner of the Moog synthesizer used for the cover photo

1968 debut albums
1960s classical albums
Recordings of Johann Sebastian Bach
Covers albums
Wendy Carlos albums
Albums produced by Wendy Carlos
Albums produced by Rachel Elkind
Sony Classical Records albums
United States National Recording Registry recordings
United States National Recording Registry albums